Deylaman (also Romanized as Deylamān, Dailimān, and Dil’man) is a city and capital of Deylaman District, in Siahkal County, Gilan Province, Iran.  At the 2006 census, its population was 1,261, living in 374 families.

Gallery

References

Populated places in Siahkal County
Cities in Gilan Province